Emina Bektas and Alexa Guarachi were the defending champions, but Bektas chose not to participate. 

Guarachi played alongside Erin Routliffe and successfully defended her title. The pair defeated Louisa Chirico and Allie Kiick in the final, 6–1, 3–6, [10–5].

Seeds

Draw

Draw

References
Main Draw

LTP Charleston Pro Tennis - Doubles